The 1983 Navy Midshipmen football team represented the United States Naval Academy (USNA) as an independent during the 1983 NCAA Division I-A football season. The team was led by second-year head coach Gary Tranquill.

Schedule

Personnel

Season summary

Pittsburgh
Napoleon McCallum 172 Rush Yds

vs Army

References

Navy
Navy Midshipmen football seasons
Navy Midshipmen football